Kulani Baloyi (born 17 May 1996) is a South African cricketer. He made his Twenty20 debut for Northerns in the 2018 Africa T20 Cup on 15 September 2018. He made his List A debut for Northerns in the 2018–19 CSA Provincial One-Day Challenge on 17 March 2019. He made his first-class debut for Northerns in the final of the 2018–19 CSA 3-Day Provincial Cup on 11 April 2019.

References

External links
 

1996 births
Living people
South African cricketers
Northerns cricketers
Place of birth missing (living people)